Howard Hawks (1896–1977) was an American film director who made 40 films between 1926 and 1970. He is responsible for classic films in genres ranging from film noir, screwball comedy, crime, science fiction and Western.

Films directed

Films produced only

Documentary appearances

Unfinished projects

References

Hawks, Howard
Films directed by Howard Hawks